Stegea jamaicensis is a moth in the family Crambidae. It is found in Jamaica.

References

Moths described in 1964
Glaphyriinae